Kim Young-min, is a South Korean actor. He is best known for his roles in television series My Mister (2018), Crash Landing on You (2019), The World of the Married (2020), and Military Prosecutor Doberman (2022).

Filmography

Film

Television series

Theatre

Awards and nominations

References

External links 
 
 
 

1971 births
Living people
South Korean male film actors
South Korean male television actors
South Korean male stage actors
21st-century South Korean male actors